Bhamashah Stadium is cricket ground in Meerut, Uttar Pradesh. It has hosted five matches for Uttar Pradesh cricket team till November 2013 since making its debut in 2003 when Uttar Pradesh cricket team played against Punjab cricket team as match ended in a draw.   Manish Pandey scored 194 in a match between Karnataka cricket team and home team Uttar Pradesh cricket team. The stadium is home of Indian fast-bowler Praveen Kumar and Bhuvneshwar Kumar. It is a domestic cricket stadium.

References

External links
Cricinfo profile
Cricketarchive.com

Cricket grounds in Uttar Pradesh
Buildings and structures in Meerut
Sports venues completed in 2003
2003 establishments in Uttar Pradesh